Wimpole Home Farm is an 18th-century model farm on the Wimpole Estate, Arrington, Royston, in South Cambridgeshire, England, and operated by the National Trust. It is one of 16 Rare Breeds Survival Trust approved farm parks.

Originally built in 1794 as a model farm by Sir John Soane for Philip Yorke, 3rd Earl of Hardwicke, the farm today displays a collection of farm implements and is home to a number of rare breeds of farm animals.

The farm contains several listed buildings and structures. The Great Barn is listed Grade II*. The farmhouse, cart shed, and the loose boxes north west of the barn are all listed Grade II. The "K6" model red telephone box on the farm is also Grade II listed.

References

External links
 
 Wimpole Home Farm, Approved Farm Park in East Anglia at Rare Breeds Survival Trust

1794 establishments in England
Farm museums in England
John Soane buildings
Grade II listed agricultural buildings
Grade II* listed agricultural buildings
Grade II listed buildings in Cambridgeshire
Grade II* listed buildings in Cambridgeshire
Grade II listed houses
National Trust properties in Cambridgeshire
Museums in Cambridgeshire
Home Farm